The following is a list of Israeli classical composers.

A

B

C

D

E

F

G

H

I

K

L

M

N

O

P

R

S

T

W

V

Y

Z

External links
https://web.archive.org/web/20110822081822/http://www.imi.org.il/ComposersList.aspx?letter=0.  Gallery of composers (includes biographies) of the Israel Music Institute.  Accessed January 18, 2010.
"Members Composers".  Database of composer members of the Israel Composers League.  Accessed January 18, 2010.

Classical composers
Classical composers
 Israeli Classical composers
Israeli
Composers